Raymond Boisset (26 March 1912 – 6 July 1991) was a French sprinter. He competed in the men's 400 metres at the 1936 Summer Olympics.

References

1912 births
1991 deaths
Athletes (track and field) at the 1936 Summer Olympics
French male sprinters
Olympic athletes of France
Place of birth missing